BT Global is a division of United Kingdom telecommunications company BT Group that provides global security, cloud and networking services to multinational companies worldwide, with operations in 180 countries. It was established in July 2000 as BT Ignite.

History

Renaming
BT Group began operating as a private corporation after the Telecommunications Act 1984.

During the 1990s, between the loosening of national telecom monopolies and the current (largely) liberalised market, BT Group entered into a number of alliances in order to serve its mainly, then, UK-based multi-national customers. From the 90's through the early 2000s, BT Group, then known as British Telecom, struggled. The company failed to secure a strong partner, struggled to expand internationally, and had significant debt.

In 2002, the attempt at an alliance (Concert 2 with AT&T) was disbanded. Thereafter, the company brought together a number of joint ventures, partly owned assets and wholly owned subsidiaries into the single entity that exists today.

On April 1, 2002, BT’s contracts with former Concert customers were transferred to BT Global and BT Retail. BT Ignite was renamed BT Global in April 2003. By late 2003, around 50% of BT Global ’ about 5,000 staff were employed outside the UK.

Acquisitions
Between 2002 and 2009, the Global division made a string of acquisitions to expand its global footprint and broaden its business offer to customers.  Most notable are Radianz, the then network arm of Reuters in 2005; the global network operator Infonet in 2005;
managed security market leader Counterpane in 2006;
US IT consultancy company International Network Services Corp. (INS) in 2007;
and Asian systems integrator Frontline in 2008. In 2016, Global signed an agreement to acquire IP Trade S.A., a provider of unified communications and collaboration solutions for trading floor environments and command-and-control dispatch centres.

Customers 

In 2005, Global won a multi-year worldwide outsourcing contract to provide communication and IT services to FIAT in a deal worth €450 million (£303 million) over five years across 40 countries. BT also acquired Fiat's subsidiary, Atlanet for €80 million which provides domestic telecoms services to Fiat and other business customers across Italy. In 2006, Atlanet was merged with Albacom to form BT Italia.

In 2006, Global agreed a £100 million seven-year worldwide outsourcing contract to provide communication and IT services to PepsiCo, across their 900 locations in more than 60 countries as well as upgrading their network infrastructure.

In 2008, Global agreed a $650 million (£332 million) five-year worldwide outsourcing contract to provide communication and IT services to Procter & Gamble, across more than 1,100 locations in more than 80 countries.

In January 2016, Global agreed a £100 million seven-year contract with the BBC to provide its broadcast network from April 2017, when it finishes its remaining contract with Vodafone UK via Atos. The deal will see the BBC move to a new, state-of-the-art network that will link all BBC UK sites, including 21 broadcasting centres and local radio stations, as well as connecting to the main overseas bureaux and partners for playout of the BBC’s TV channels. It will carry all video, audio and data traffic, as well as fixed-line telephony, ISDN and broadband services.

On 10 February 2016, Global announced it has been awarded a five-year contract worth more than £9 million, to deliver computer and data centre services to Bromley London Borough Council. The contract was won by BT as part of a pan-London framework agreement for information and communications technology (ICT) services set up by Westminster City Council, the Royal Borough of Kensington and Chelsea and Hammersmith and Fulham councils.

Global also manages the global networked IT estates for Komatsu and Randstad Holding.

In January 2019 BT became the first international group to receive two national telecoms licences from China’s Ministry of Industry and Information Technology which will enable it to sell services direct to Chinese customers.

Finances 
At the start of 2009, Global took a £340m writedown due to poor "cost controls" shortly after the resignation of its CEO François Barrault. Later in the year the company reported losses of £2.1bn, despite sales of £8.8 billion. Global then underwent a transformation programme, including cost saving initiatives, leading to substantial increases of EBITDA, operating profits and operating cash flow during its 2009–2010 financial year. In May 2010, BT announced an investment plan to increase its capabilities in the Asia-Pacific region. By the end of its 2010–2011 financial year, Global had increased orders with customers by 10% year on year, improved profitability, and became operating cash flow positive a year ahead of schedule.

Total income for Global in 2016-7 was more than £5bn.

In 2017-2018 financial year Global reported a £5bn revenue, £434m EBITDA and £10m operating profit.

Management
From 2004 until 2008 François Barrault was CEO of BT Global  and president of BT International, before leaving the company after poor financial performance results. He was replaced by Hanif Lalani. Jeff Kelly was appointed CEO in early 2010. Luis Alvarez was appointed CEO, in October 2012. Prior, Alvarez had been president of BT’s European, Middle East, Africa and Latin American operations. Bas Burger was appointed CEO on 1 June 2017. Martin Smith is Chief Finance Officer, Kevin Taylor is president of BT in Asia, Middle East and Africa, Chet Patel is Chief Transformation Officer and president of BT in Continental Europe, Ashish Gupta is president of BT in the UK and Global Banking and Financial Services, and Jennifer Artley is president of BT in the Americas.
BT Global have a business management system run on a Qualsys quality management system.

Future 
On 16 December 2022, BT announced that Global would be merged with Enterprise to form a new division, BT Business, in an effort to save £100 million each year by the end of the 2025 financial year. The new division will be led by Bas Burger.

References

External links 
 

BT Group